The 1980–81 season was the 57th season in the existence of AEK Athens F.C. and the 22nd consecutive season in the top flight of Greek football. They competed in the Alpha Ethniki, the Greek Cup and the Balkans Cup. The season began on 7 September 1980 and finished on 14 June 1981.

Overview

AEK entered the decade, essentially closing one of its most successful historical periods, since this season was the last year of Loukas Barlos at the management of the team. The championship of this season was the second in a row professional football championship in Greece. The club did not play in the UEFA competitions this year, thus they played in the Balkans Cup instead.

AEK with their veteran player and 1963 champion with the yellow-black jersey, Miltos Papapostolou on the bench started ideally the league scoring a 6 wins in a row. Among others, they beat PAOK away and Olympiacos at home, as a result they were named by many as favorite for the title  early on. It was noteworthy that AEK set an all time ticket record at home, in a league game against Panathinaikos, after 36,766 tickets were sold. However, the follow-up was not proportionate. AEK, although they finished the championship having by far the best attack with 63 goals and Dušan Bajević as their top scorer with 12, were betrayed by their mediocre defensive performance. The second round of the championship was not good for the team, culminating in the derby with Olympiacos at Karaiskakis Stadium. AEK went down in the match having 2 points less than the first Olympiacos and were looking for the victory that would bring them to top of the standings. Nevertheless, they play a terrible game and a disastrous second half where they conceded 5 goals in 27 minutes and experienced one of the worst defeats in their history by 6–0. However, the defeat and the match were overshadowed by the tragic events at gate 7 of the stadium, where the fans, trying to leave the field, were trapped and many are trampled, resulting in the death of 21 people and the injury of more than 50 people. At the end of the season AEK finished at the second place five points behind Olympiacos, but were not qualified for any European competition, carrying a ban from the previous season.

In the Greek Cup, AEK eliminated Egaleo at the first round, the title defender, Kastoria at the second round, Panathinaikos at the round of 16 and Aris in the quarter-finals. In the semi-finals they were drawn with PAOK and faced elimination by 2 defeats without scoring a single goal. In the Balkans Cup, AEK were eliminated in the group stage, where all three teams were on par and Velež Mostar with a better goal ratio were qualified to the final of the institution.

Barlos left AEK Athens at the end of the season as a result of the dire financial situation that came from his involvement with the club, but also due to his inability to follow the new model of professional football, fearing alienation through the professionalism that was entering into the field of football. At the end of the year, one of the stars of the team, Dušan Bajević, left with him.

Players

Squad information

NOTE: The players are the ones that have been announced by the AEK Athens' press release. No edits should be made unless a player arrival or exit is announced. Updated 30 June 1981, 23:59 UTC+3.

Transfers

In

Summer

 a.  and Christos Kalaitzidis as an exchange.

Winter

Out

Summer

Winter

Loan out

Summer

Winter

Renewals

Overall transfer activity

Expenditure
Summer:  ₯8,000,000

Winter:  ₯0

Total:  ₯8,000,000

Income
Summer:  ₯0

Winter:  ₯0

Total:  ₯0

Net Totals
Summer:  ₯8,000,000

Winter:  ₯0

Total:  ₯8,000,000

Pre-season and friendlies

Alpha Ethniki

League table

Results summary

Results by Matchday

Fixtures

Greek Cup

Matches

Round of 16

Quarter-finals

Semi-finals

Balkans Cup

Group Α

Statistics

Squad statistics

! colspan="11" style="background:#FFDE00; text-align:center" | Goalkeepers
|-

! colspan="11" style="background:#FFDE00; color:black; text-align:center;"| Defenders
|-

! colspan="11" style="background:#FFDE00; color:black; text-align:center;"| Midfielders
|-

! colspan="11" style="background:#FFDE00; color:black; text-align:center;"| Forwards
|-

! colspan="11" style="background:#FFDE00; color:black; text-align:center;"| Left during Winter Transfer Window
|-

|}

Disciplinary record

|-
! colspan="17" style="background:#FFDE00; text-align:center" | Goalkeepers

|-
! colspan="17" style="background:#FFDE00; color:black; text-align:center;"| Defenders

|-
! colspan="17" style="background:#FFDE00; color:black; text-align:center;"| Midfielders

|-
! colspan="17" style="background:#FFDE00; color:black; text-align:center;"| Forwards

|-
! colspan="17" style="background:#FFDE00; color:black; text-align:center;"| Left during Winter Transfer Window

|}

References

External links
AEK Athens F.C. Official Website

AEK Athens F.C. seasons
AEK Athens